The Netaji Subhash Chandra Bose Indoor Stadium is an indoor sports arena in Kolkata, West Bengal, India. The facility seats 12,000 people. This indoor stadium is located just beside the Eden Gardens. It used to host the Sunfeast Open, a WTA Tour tennis tournament. Other international events hosted by the Stadium include the 1981 Asian Basketball Championship. Currently, it is the home of the Pro Kabaddi League team Bengal Warriors.

The Netaji Indoor Stadium hosts a wide range of activities, from sporting events to cultural programmes. It is a venue for both national and international trade fairs. It is also used as a center of counting of votes during elections.

The venue was inaugurated in 1975 by the then Chief Minister of West Bengal, Siddhartha Shankar Ray,  for indoor games and cultural events, musical functions and other programmes.

See also
 List of indoor arenas in India
 List of tennis stadiums by capacity

References

External links

Tennis venues in India
Indoor arenas in India
Sports venues in Kolkata
Memorials to Subhas Chandra Bose
Kabaddi venues in India
Sports venues completed in 1975
1975 establishments in West Bengal
Basketball venues in India
Futsal venues
20th-century architecture in India